The fishing cat (Prionailurus viverrinus) is a medium-sized wild cat of South and Southeast Asia. Since 2016, it is listed as Vulnerable on the IUCN Red List. Fishing cat populations are threatened by destruction of wetlands and have declined severely over the last decade. The fishing cat lives foremost in the vicinity of wetlands, along rivers, streams, oxbow lakes, in swamps, and mangroves.

The fishing cat is the state animal of West Bengal.

Taxonomy 
Felis viverrinus was proposed by Edward Turner Bennett in 1833 who described a fishing cat skin from India. Prionailurus was proposed by Nikolai Severtzov in 1858 as generic name for spotted wild cats native to Asia. Felis viverrinus rhizophoreus was proposed by Henri Jacob Victor Sody in 1936 who described a specimen from the north coast of West Java that had a slightly shorter skull than fishing cat specimens from Thailand. There is evidence that the nominate taxon and the Javan fishing cat are distinguishable by skull morphometrics.

Phylogeny 

Both models agree in the rusty-spotted cat (P. rubiginosus) having been the first cat of the Prionailurus lineage that genetically diverged, followed by the flat-headed cat (P. planiceps) and then the fishing cat.
The following cladogram shows the phylogenetic relationships of the fishing cat as derived through analysis of nuclear DNA:

Characteristics

The fishing cat has a deep yellowish-grey fur with black lines and spots. Two stripes are on the cheeks, and two above the eyes running to the neck with broken lines on the forehead. It has two rows of spots around the throat. The spots on the shoulder are longitudinal, and those on the sides, limbs and tail are roundish. The background colour of its fur varies between individuals from yellowish tawny to ashy grey, and the size of the stripes from narrow to broad. The fur on the belly is lighter than on the back and sides. The short and rounded ears are set low on the head, and the back of the ears bear a white spot. The tail is short, less than half the length of head and body, and with a few black rings at the end. As an aquatic adaptation, the fur is layered. A short, dense layer provides a water barrier and thermal insulation, while another layer of protruding long guard hairs provides its pattern and glossy sheen.

The fishing cat is the largest cat of the Prionailurus. It is about twice the size of a domestic cat and stocky and muscular with medium to short legs.

Its paws are less completely webbed than those of the leopard cat, and the claws are incompletely sheathed so that they protrude slightly when retracted. Webbed feet have often been noted as a characteristic of the fishing cat, but the webbing beneath the toes is not much more developed than that of a bobcat.

Distribution and habitat

The fishing cat is broadly but discontinuously distributed in South and Southeast Asia.
It is strongly associated with wetlands, inhabiting swamps and marshy areas around oxbow lakes, reed beds, tidal creeks and mangrove forests; it seems less abundant around smaller, fast-moving watercourses. Most records are from lowland areas.

In Pakistan's Sindh Province, the fishing cat was recorded in the Chotiari Dam area in 2012.

In the Nepal Terai, it has been recorded in Shuklaphanta, Bardia, Chitwan and Parsa National Parks and in Koshi Tappu Wildlife Reserve.

In India, its presence has been documented in:
Ranthambore National Park, in Pilibhit, Dudhwa and Valmiki Tiger Reserves, in Sur Sarovar Bird Sanctuary,
outside protected areas in West Bengal, in Lothian Island Wildlife Sanctuary in the Sundarbans,
in Odisha's Bhitarkanika Wildlife Sanctuary and coastal districts outside protected areas,
 in Andhra Pradesh's Coringa Wildlife Sanctuary, Krishna Wildlife Sanctuary and adjoining reserve forests.

Reports in Bangladeshi newspapers indicate that fishing cats live in all divisions of Bangladesh but are severely threatened; villagers killed at least 30 fishing cats between January 2010 and March 2013.
In Sri Lanka, it has been recorded in multiple localities ranging from coastal to hilly regions.

In Myanmar, it was recorded in the Ayeyarwady Delta in 2016 and 2018.

In Thailand, its presence has been documented in Khao Sam Roi Yot National Park and Thale Noi Non-Hunting Area along the coast, and in Kaeng Krachan National Park. Between 2007 and 2016, it was also recorded near wetlands outside protected areas in Phitsanulok Province, Bang Khun Thian District, Samut Sakhon Province, Phetchaburi and Songkhla Provinces, and near a mangrove site in Pattani.

In Cambodia, a single fishing cat was photographed by a camera trap in Kulen Promtep Wildlife Sanctuary in March 2003. In 2008, a fishing cat kitten was found in Botum-Sakor National Park. In 2015, it was also recorded in Peam Krasop Wildlife Sanctuary.

The island of Java constitutes the southern limit of the fishing cat's range, but by the 1990s fishing cats were scarce and apparently restricted to tidal forests with sandy or muddy shores, older mangrove stands, and abandoned mangrove plantation areas with fishponds. There are no confirmed records from Peninsular Malaysia, Vietnam and Laos.

Behaviour and ecology

The fishing cat is thought to be primarily nocturnal, and is very much at home near water. It can swim long distances, even under water. Adult males and females without dependent young are solitary. Adults have been observed to make a "chuckling" sound.

The fishing cat's main prey is fish; scat collected in India's Keoladeo National Park revealed that fish comprises about three-quarters of its diet, with the remainder consisting of birds, insects, small rodents; molluscs, reptiles including snakes, amphibians and carrion of domestic cattle supplement its diet. Fishing cats have been observed while hunting along the edges of watercourses, grabbing prey from the water, and sometimes diving into the water to catch prey further from the banks.

It marks its home range using cheek-rubbing, head rubbing, chin rubbing, neck rubbing and urine-spraying to leave scent marks. It also sharpens its claws and displays flehmen.

Reproduction and development

Wild fishing cats most likely mate during January and February; most kittens in the wild were observed in March and April. In captivity, the gestation period lasts 63–70 days; females give birth to two or three kittens. They begin to play in water and to take solid food when about two months old, but are not fully weaned until six months old. They reach full adult size when about eight and a half months old, acquire their adult canine teeth by 11 months, and are sexually mature when approximately 15 months old. They live up to 10 years in captivity.

Threats 
The fishing cat is threatened by destruction of wetlands, which are increasingly being polluted and converted for agricultural use and human settlements. The conversion of mangrove forests to commercial aquaculture ponds is a major threat in Andhra Pradesh, where the targeted killing of fishing cats is also prevalent where there is human/animal conflict. Over-exploitation of local fish stocks and retaliatory killing are also significant threats.
In West Bengal's Howrah district, 27 dead fishing cats were recorded between April 2010 and May 2011. In Bangladesh, at least 30 fishing cats were killed by local people in three years between January 2010 and March 2013. Furthermore, in a study in Thailand, 84% of all fishing cats that were tracked via radio collars were killed – either due to poaching or unknown causes.

The fishing cat is possibly extinct in coastal Kerala, India.

Conservation 

Prionailurus viverrinus is included on CITES Appendix II, and protected by national legislation over most of its range. Hunting is prohibited in Bangladesh, Cambodia, China, India, Indonesia, Myanmar, Nepal, Pakistan, Sri Lanka, Thailand. Hunting regulations apply in Lao PDR. In Bhutan and Vietnam, the species is not protected outside protected areas.
Its survival depends on protection of wetlands, prevention of indiscriminate trapping, snaring and poisoning.

In areas where habitat degradation is a major concern, such as coastal Andhra Pradesh, NGOs are working to slow habitat conversion in collaboration with local villagers. Part of this work involves creating alternative livelihood programs that allow villagers to earn money without damaging natural habitats.

In captivity 

Fishing cat captive breeding programmes have been established by the European Association of Zoos and Aquaria and the American Association of Zoos and Aquariums. All the fishing cats kept in zoos around the world are listed in the International Studbook of the World Association of Zoos and Aquariums.

Local names 
In Assamese, the fishing cat is known as meseka, probably derived from mas meaning "fish".

In Bengali, the fishing cat is known as "mach-baghrol" (Bengali: বাঘরোল) and "bagh-dasha".
"Mācha" means "fish", and "bāgha" means "tiger".

In Hindi, it is known as "bunbiral" and "khupya bagh".

In Telugu, it is called "bavuru pilli" meaning "wild cat".

In Thai, it is called "suea pla", literally "fish tiger".

In Burmese, it is called "Kyaung-ta-nga" "ကြောင်တံငါ" "Kyaung" means "cat" and "ta-nga" means "fisherman".

References

External links

ARKive: Prionailurus viverrinus with images and movies
BioGraphic: Fishing Cat's Cradle by Morgan Heim and Katie Jewett, October 2016

Fishing Cat Conservancy
Fishing Cat Working Group
IUCN/SSC Cat Specialist Group: Fishing cat Prionailurus viverrinus
The Jaguar and its Allies: The Fishing Cat

Prionailurus
Taxa named by Edward Turner Bennett
Mammals described in 1833
Mammals of South Asia
Mammals of Sindh
Mammals of Sri Lanka
Mammals of Nepal
Felids of India
Mammals of Bangladesh
Mammals of Myanmar
Mammals of Thailand
Mammals of Cambodia
Symbols of West Bengal